Sudbach is a small river of North Rhine-Westphalia, Germany. It flows into the Werre near Löhne.

See also
List of rivers of North Rhine-Westphalia

Rivers of North Rhine-Westphalia
Rivers of Germany